NATO STANAG 4671 is the NATO Standardized Agreement 4671 which is the UAV SYSTEM Airworthiness REQUIREMENTS (USAR). It is intended to allow military Unmanned aerial vehicles (UAVs) to operate in other NATO members airspace.

Page 1 of edition 1 states:

Edition 1  was promulgated in September 2009. Edition 2 was promulgated in February 2017.

Draft edition 3 was being commented on (e.g. by the aircraft industry) in Sept 2014, calling attention to slow progress and highlighting concerns. Edition 3  was promulgated in Apr 2019.

Background
The task to initiate this standard resulted from a NATO meeting of the Flight In Non-Segregated Airspace (FINAS) Working Group, September 2004. There were no known international military standards for unmanned airworthiness. To prepare for the possible acquisition of a NATO-owned unmanned aerial vehicle (UAV), the level of airworthiness was essential so that industry could meet the alliance requirement.

At the March 2005 FINAS meeting, France offered their national standard developed by Direction Générale de L'armement (DGA) to be an initial basis for a NATO standard. The DGA document was titled “UAV System Airworthiness Requirements” a designation that France asked to be applied in NATO. This DGA standard was structured on the basis of EASA Certification Specification 23, CS-23 Normal, Utility, Aerobatic and Commuter Aeroplanes. The offer was accepted and the FINAS Chairman established a UAV System Airworthiness Requirements (USAR) Specialist Team (ST) to lead the production of document to establish guidelines for NATO UAV airworthiness. The French agreed to lead the ST.

The initial mandate of the ST was to recommend NATO-wide guidelines for UAV airworthiness to allow the cross-border operation of unmanned aerial vehicles (UAVs) in non-segregated airspace.

Scope
It covers fixed-wing military UAVs from 150 kg to 20,000 kg, that do NOT need "for normal operation the presence of a pilot that directly controls the UAV using a control box (e.g., stick, rudder pedals, throttles, etc.)"

It covers all aspects of the UAV system including communication links and control centre.

It covers, e.g. ground handling characteristics, landing gear, UAV external 'position' lights, Command and control data link loss strategy, Emergency recovery capability, (including deliberate flight termination using explosives).

UAV safety requirements

Sense and avoid

Page 7 states "It is recognized that ‘sense and avoid’ is a key enabling issue for UAV operations. The derivation and definition of ‘sense and avoid’ requirements is primarily an operational issue and hence outside the scope of USAR. However, once these requirements have been clarified, any system designed
and installed to achieve these objectives is an item of installed equipment within a UAV System and
hence falls under the airworthiness requirements of USAR."

Ratifying countries
Ratifying countries are listed in the front of AEP-4671, Ed. B Ver. 1, found on the NATO Standardization Office web site.  National reservations are also listed.

Compliant UAVs
* Elbit Systems Hermes 900 "StarLiner"

UAVs intended to be Compliant

 SAGEM Patroller
 General Atomics MQ-9 Reaper#Certifiable Predator B
 Vestel karayel

See also
 EuroHawk: would need much work to be compliant

References

Further reading
 NATO Developments in UAS Airworthiness and Sense & Avoid Functional Requirements. Seagle. 2007

NATO Standardization Agreements
Regulation of unmanned aerial vehicles